Gyrinoides limbatus is an extinct species of beetle in the family Gyrinidae, the only species in the genus Gyrinoides.

References

†
†
Prehistoric beetle genera
Taxa named by Victor Motschulsky